A theyby (plural theybies) or non-binary baby is a neologism for a baby or child raised in a way that is gender-neutral, allowing children to choose their own gender, and also referring to the accompanying parenting style. The term and movement was initially popularized in 2018, preceding several reports of babies in 2017 being born without being assigned a gender. The practice of raising babies as gender neutral has been reported as early as 2009 and 2011, however the term "theybie" was first used in 2017. The term is a portmanteau of the pronoun 'they' and 'baby'. Until children raised as theybies choose their gender and pronouns, they are referred to by the parents using they/them pronouns.

Origins and motivations 
In many modern civilizations, a binary gender classification exists and is generally enforced from birth. In recent years, there has been increasing scrutiny of gendered socialization in parenting communities, with some questioning the extent to which the gender binary is innate versus just being the only option presented. Parents of theybies' motivations for choosing to raise their child this way include supporting gender diversity, improving self-determination of gender, reducing sexism, and reducing the developmental effects of gender stereotypes on children. Additionally, many assert that "what their child has 'between their legs'" is not relevant to their gender presentation and is, simply, "nobody's business".

Many parents of children who are LGBT subscribe to a "born this way" view on sexual orientation and gender identity, contrasting the belief that parenting choices can "make" children non-heterosexual. This argument has been echoed by parents who practice gender-neutral parenting, they use this view to emphasize their children may or may not necessarily identify as LGBT when they are old enough to decide on their own who they are, as they believe identity is innate and not changed by their upbringing.

The varying degrees to which parents attempt to reduce the effects of gendered socialization can depend on how hostile their community is when confronted with those who choose to parent outside the gender binary. LGBT parents report higher levels of anxiety when making the decision to raise their child as a theybie or to allow them to explore gender from a young age. This is due to the higher scrutiny these parents face from critics who believe that being raised by two parents who are the same gender will "make" a child gay. These parents have also acknowledged that in some situations they even go against their personal beliefs about gender-neutrality for their children or are inconsistent with their resistance of stereotypes due to their feeling of higher scrutinization.

Associated parenting style 
Aside from not disclosing their child's biological sex at birth (the most literal practice of raising a theybie), there are a variety of approaches of differing severity that parents have adopted when introducing gender neutrality into their parenting. The majority of parents who have shared their experiences with gender-neutral parenting or raising a theybie report that they believe in a child-centered approach to parenting.

One of the most common ways gender-neutral parenting has been practiced is through varying children's toy options. The vast majority of children's toys are strictly separated by gender, with different skills being prioritized between the two. Toys marketed as "for girls" tend to focus on encouraging domesticity, vanity, and general emotional awareness. Alternatively, toys "for boys" most often focus on increasing spatial reasoning skills, encouraging physicality, and normalizing aggression. By encouraging only specific skillsets for each gender, they both end up having gaps in life skills that make their options later in life more limited. This has contributed to the current societal norm of men working and generally being in positions of more power, and women taking care of their children and handling domestic duties. To combat these gaps, parents have started offering their children some toy options that are gender-neutral and some toys geared towards each gender, all framed as equally preferable choices. This variety of options is often offered in other important aspects of childhood development such as clothing and extracurricular activities.

Legal recognition 

In the United States, various states have passed legislation allowing for gender-neutral identifiers on birth certificates, including:

It is also possible to receive a "U" gender marker for babies in Canada.

Criticism 
There has been criticism towards the concept of theybies, including from Christian organizations and by political commentator Steven Crowder. Common criticisms include that it is a selfish choice on the part of the parent, equating a choice on gender to be a choice of anatomy, that it is harmful to keep the gender "secret" from other people, and the possibility of increased child bullying.

Parents of theybies have also expressed consideration at the possibility of increased bullying rates:

Although the principle and reports do not set an age limit before children can decide their gender, some critics consider an age limit before children can choose their gender a key component of theybies, and suggest that such an age limit is unethical.

See also 

 Sex assignment at birth
 Intersex
 Non-binary gender

References 

LGBT parenting
LGBT terminology
Non-binary gender
LGBT youth
Gender-neutral language